Once a Thief is a 1991 Hong Kong heist comedy film directed by John Woo, who also wrote the screenplay with Janet Chun and Clifton Ko. The film stars Chow Yun-fat, Leslie Cheung, Cherie Chung, Kenneth Tsang and Paul Chu. The film was released on 2 February 1991.

Plot
The story is about three orphans and their two father figures. They are taken in by both a wealthy crime boss which leads to their close friendship, and a kind police officer. Nevertheless, the trio grows up learning high-tech methods of theft and specialise in stealing treasured paintings. After a heist in France goes awry, Red Bean Pudding is thought to be dead and James takes his place as Red Bean's lover. However, Pudding returns in a wheelchair, and the group begins planning their next heist for themselves, fall out of favour with Chow, and various complications and gun battles ensue.

Cast 
 Chow Yun-fat as Red Bean Pudding/Joey
 Leslie Cheung as James
 Cherie Chung as Red Bean/Cheri
 Kenneth Tsang as Chow
 Paul Chu as Godfather
 Bowie Wu as Stanley Wu
 John Tang Yat-gwan as Young Red Bean Pudding
 Tong Ka-fai as Young James
 Leila Tong as Young Red Bean
 Declan Wong as Magician Henchman
 David Wu as Auctioneer
 Pierre-Yves Burton as Mr Le Bond, a Frenchman who hires Joey, and James to steal a painting, but later betrays them. Le Bond is later murdered by Chow's henchmen as a loose end.

Release 
The film grossed HK$33,397,149 in Hong Kong.

Columbia Tri-Star released it on DVD in the United States on 22 April 2003. It included no special features beyond trailers. On 27 December 2004, Hong Kong Legends released a DVD in the United Kingdom. Eight months later, on 5 September 2005, the John Woo Collection, a four-disc DVD set, was released. It includes the two action films Bullet in the Head and The Killer.

Reception 
Scott Tobias of The A.V. Club wrote that Woo's style makes up for the film's implausibility and lack of logic. Kevin Lee DVD Verdict wrote that the film has "a lack of focus and an uneven tone". Chris Gould of DVDactive.com rated the film 5/10 and wrote that there was too much slapstick. J. Doyle Wallis of DVD Talk rated it 2.5/5 stars and called it "an odd and annoyingly silly entry during [John Woo's] most creative period".

Accolades

See also 
 Once a Thief (1996), a Canadian television film remake starring with Nicholas Lea and Ivan Sergei that was later spun off into a television series of the same name which ran from 1997 to 1998. Both films were directed by John Woo.

References

External links 
 
 
 
 

1991 films
1991 comedy films
1990s buddy comedy films
1990s crime comedy films
1990s heist films
1990s martial arts comedy films
1990s Cantonese-language films
Films about orphans
Films about theft
Films directed by John Woo
Films set in Hong Kong
Films set in Paris
Films set in Vancouver
Gun fu films
Hong Kong buddy films
Hong Kong crime comedy films
Hong Kong heist films
Hong Kong martial arts comedy films
Hong Kong New Wave films
1990s Hong Kong films